USS PC-1168 was a  built for the United States Navy during World War II. PC-1168 is notable for being the ship on which the film You're in the Navy Now, which starred Gary Cooper, was filmed in 1950. The ship was later transferred to the Republic of China Navy, serving from 1954 to 1970 as ROCS Ching Kiang (PC-116).

Career
PC-1168 was laid down on 3 April 1943 at the Sullivan Drydock and Repair Corporation in Brooklyn, New York. She was launched on 3 July and commissioned 3 December 1943, one of 403 members of her class of 173-foot steel-hulled submarine chasers. These ships were of a flush-deck design similar to that of World War I "four-piper" destroyers, but were half the size and complement of their big sisters.

On 19 May 1954 she was decommissioned and transferred to the Republic of China as PC-116.

References

Sources
 PC-1168 information from navsource.org

PC-461-class submarine chasers
Ships built in Brooklyn
1943 ships
World War II patrol vessels of the United States
Cold War patrol vessels of the United States
PC-461-class submarine chasers of the Republic of China Navy